Solute carrier family 9 member A4 is a protein that in humans is encoded by the SLC9A4 gene.

References

Further reading